The 2015 Nasarawa State gubernatorial election occurred in Nigeria on April 11, 2015, the APC nominee Umaru Tanko Al-Makura won re-election, defeating Labaran Maku of the APGA.

Umaru Tanko Al-Makura emerged APC gubernatorial candidate after defeating  2 other candidates who are Reuben Audu and James Angbazo. He picked Silas Ali Agara as his running mate. Labaran Maku was the APGA candidate with Abua Alhaji Ibrahim as his running mate. 8 candidates contested in the election.

Electoral system
The Governor of Nasarawa State is elected using the plurality voting system.

Primary election

APC primary
The APC primary election was held on December 6, 2014. Umaru Tanko Al-Makura won the primary election after defeating  2 other candidates, Reuben Audu and James Angbazo.

APGA primary
Labaran Maku  was granted waiver by the APGA therefore, emerged the party's flag bearer. Maku's name was sent to INEC as a substitute for Matthew Ombugaku who earlier emerged the governorship candidate in the primary election.

Results
A total number of 8 candidates registered with the Independent National Electoral Commission to contest in the election.

The total number of 623,279 votes were cast and 771 votes were rejected.

References 

Nasarawa State gubernatorial election
2015
April 2015 events in Nigeria